Regresa a mí may refer to:

 "Regresa a mí" (Thalía song), 2000
 "Regresa a mí" (Il Divo song), 2004